Nova Husarivka is a village in Izium Raion (district) in Kharkiv Oblast of eastern Ukraine, at about  south-east from the centre of Kharkiv city.

The settlement came under attack by Russian forces during the Russian invasion of Ukraine in 2022.

References

Villages in Izium Raion